Carano is a frazione of the comune (municipality) of Ville di Fiemme in Trentino in the northern Italian region Trentino-Alto Adige/Südtirol, located about  northeast of Trento. It was a separate municipality until 1 January 2020, when it was merged with Daiano and Varena.
   

Cities and towns in Trentino-Alto Adige/Südtirol